Stronghold Builder's Guidebook is a sourcebook for the 3rd edition of the Dungeons & Dragons fantasy role-playing game.

Contents
This 128-page book begins with a table of contents with a list of tables found in the book, followed by a brief introduction on page 4. Chapter 1: Building a Stronghold (pages 4–14) details a step-by-step process by with DMs and players can design a stronghold. Notes provided include how to stock the structure with gear and fill it with people, and figuring how much it costs. Chapter 2: Stronghold Components (pages 14–86) describes where and how to place items such as walls and doors, and various locations that can be placed within a stronghold. Also described are suggestions on how to place magic items, spells, traps, and siege weapons in a stronghold. Chapter 3: Strongholds in Your Campaign (pages 87–104) includes tips for building a campaign with a stronghold as the setting, as well as how to use the book in adventures that have already been established. This chapter also details how a stronghold can be attacked or defended during combat. Chapter 4: Example Strongholds (pages 104-128) provides room-by-room descriptions and maps for five detailed structures that can be used in a campaign. These include a simple keep, an undersea castle made of coral, a dwarven redoubt, a floating tower, and a citadel of the planes.

Publication history
The book was published in 2002, and was written by Matt Forbeck and David Noonan, with cover art by Brom and interior art by David Day.

Reception
A review from RPGnet said that "All in all, the Stronghold Builder’s Guide is a useful, solid product. It is well designed, clean and well written, but lacks a certain amount of flair that would have made it truly outstanding, the authors not having quite gone the extra mile."

References

 Noonan, David. Stronghold Builder's Guidebook (Wizards of the Coast, 2002).

Further reading
 Drader, Darrin. "Every Home a Castle, Dragon #295 (March 2002)
 Smith, Mat and Matthew Sernett. "Mortar and Stone, Dragon #295 (March 2002)
 "At the Table: Stone Tower, Dragon #295 (March 2002)

Dungeons & Dragons sourcebooks
Role-playing game supplements introduced in 2002